Andreas Estner (born 3 July 2000) is a German racing driver who last competed in the Euroformula Open Championship with Van Amersfoort Racing. His brother Sebastian is also a racing driver.

Karting record

Karting career summary

Racing record

Career summary

† As Estner was a guest driver, he was ineligible to score points.
* Season still in progress.

Complete ADAC Formula 4 Championship results
(key) (Races in bold indicate pole position) (Races in italics indicate fastest lap)

Complete FIA Formula 3 Championship results
(key) (Races in bold indicate pole position; races in italics indicate points for the fastest lap of top ten finishers)

Complete Euroformula Open Championship results 
(key) (Races in bold indicate pole position) (Races in italics indicate fastest lap)

References

External links
Estner Racing official website
 

2000 births
Living people
German racing drivers
ADAC Formula 4 drivers
MRF Challenge Formula 2000 Championship drivers
FIA Formula 3 Championship drivers
Formula Regional European Championship drivers
Racing drivers from Bavaria
Sportspeople from Munich
Euroformula Open Championship drivers
Italian F4 Championship drivers
Formula Renault 2.0 NEC drivers
Neuhauser Racing drivers
Jenzer Motorsport drivers
Van Amersfoort Racing drivers
Campos Racing drivers
BRDC British Formula 3 Championship drivers